José Antonio Calderón Cardoso (born 14 September 1968) is a Mexican politician formerly from the Social Alliance Party. From 2000 to 2003 he served as Deputy of the LVIII Legislature of the Mexican Congress representing the Federal District. He also served as president of his party from 1999 to 2003.

References

1968 births
Living people
Politicians from Mexico City
Social Alliance Party politicians
21st-century Mexican politicians
Deputies of the LVIII Legislature of Mexico
Members of the Chamber of Deputies (Mexico) for Mexico City
National Autonomous University of Mexico alumni